Telmansky is a rural locality (a settlement) in Yagotinsky Selsoviet, Blagoveshchensky District, Altai Krai, Russia. The population was 330 as of 2013. There are 3 streets.

Geography 
Telmansky is located 31 km west of Blagoveshchenka (the district's administrative centre) by road. Yagotino is the nearest rural locality.

References 

Rural localities in Blagoveshchensky District, Altai Krai